A total of at least three special routes of U.S. Route 9 (US 9) exist and at least seven have been deleted.

Georgetown truck route

U.S. Route 9 Truck (US 9 Truck) is a  truck route of US 9 in the town of Georgetown in Sussex County, Delaware. US 9 Truck begins at an intersection between US 9 and US 113/Delaware Route 404 Truck (DE 404 Truck) to the west of Georgetown. At this point, US 9 Truck heads southeast concurrent with US 113 and DE 404 Truck on four-lane divided Dupont Boulevard. The road heads through woodland with some farmfields and businesses. US 9 Truck/DE 404 Truck split from US 113 by heading north-northeast on two-lane undivided South Bedford Street. The road passes commercial development before heading through farmland with some homes. The routes curve to the north-northwest prior to heading north. US 9 Truck/DE 404 Truck turn east onto Park Avenue and pass through residential areas before crossing the Delmarva Central Railroad's Indian River Subdivision line at-grade. The road runs through agricultural areas and passes to the south of Delaware Coastal Airport, where it makes a curve to the north. US 9 Truck/DE 404 Truck head through a mix of farmland and woodland with some homes to the east of the airport, crossing the Delmarva Central Railroad's Lewes Industrial Track line at-grade before ending at US 9/DE 404 east of Georgetown. US 9 Truck has an annual average daily traffic count ranging from a high of 30,235 vehicles at the Arrow Safety Road intersection along the US 113 concurrency to a low of 5,033 vehicles at the Zoar Road intersection. The portion of US 9 Truck concurrent with US 113 is part of the National Highway System. 

US 9 Truck was designated in 1983. The Delaware Department of Transportation (DelDOT) is planning to move US 9 Truck to a new alignment of Park Avenue located further to the south. The realigned Park Avenue will lead to a roundabout with South Bedford Street and Arrow Safety Road, from which US 9 Truck will follow Arrow Safety Road west to US 113. Utility work on the new alignment of Park Avenue began in the later part of 2021, with road construction to begin in 2022. The new alignment of US 9 Truck will be completed in 2023.

Major intersections

Lewes business route

U.S. Route 9 Business (US 9 Bus.) is a  business route off US 9 in the city of Lewes in Sussex County, Delaware. US 9 Bus. begins at the Five Points intersection in the community of Nassau, where it intersects US 9, DE 1, and the eastern terminus of DE 404. This intersection has no access to eastbound US 9/southbound DE 1 from US 9 Bus. as left turns are prohibited. From here, the route heads northeast on four-lane divided Savannah Road, soon narrowing to a two-lane undivided road. The business route runs through commercial areas to the southeast of a residential development, gaining a center left-turn lane. The road comes to an intersection with Wescoats Corner Road in the community of Wescoats Corner, which heads southeast to provide access to southbound DE 1. US 9 Bus. loses the turn lane as it continues through the residential community of Quakertown. The road continues past homes and some businesses as it enters Lewes, where it crosses the Georgetown–Lewes Trail. The route passes to the southeast of Beebe Medical Center before it crosses into the historic downtown area of Lewes, where it passes by the Zwaanendael Museum. US 9 Bus. crosses the Lewes and Rehoboth Canal on a drawbridge and runs past businesses to the northwest and marshland to the southeast. The business route passes a mix of homes and businesses before it turns east onto Cape Henlopen Drive near Lewes Beach along the Delaware Bay. US 9 Bus. runs between the bay to the north and homes to the south before it comes to its terminus at an intersection with US 9. Past here, Cape Henlopen Drive continues east as part of US 9 toward the Cape May–Lewes Ferry terminal. The entire length of US 9 Bus. is designated as part of the Historic Lewes Byway, Gateway to the Bayshore, a Delaware Byway. US 9 Bus. has an annual average daily traffic count ranging from a high of 18,511 vehicles at the Donovans Road intersection to a low of 4,782 vehicles at the eastern terminus at US 9. The route was designated on a former part of DE 18 by 1976, with US 9 routed to bypass Lewes on DE 1, Kings Highway, and the Theodore C. Freeman Highway to the south.

Major intersections

Beesley's Point temporary route

U.S. Route 9 Temporary (US 9 Temp.) was the designation for the detour around the closed Beesley's Point Bridge carrying US 9 over the Great Egg Harbor Bay between Upper Township, Cape May County and Somers Point, Atlantic County. The route headed east from US 9 in Upper Township on County Route 623 (CR 623) before heading north on the Garden State Parkway and crossing the Great Egg Harbor Bay on the Great Egg Harbor Bridge, ending at an interchange with US 9 in Somers Point. The designation was replaced by US 9 following the demolition of the bridge in 2013.

Toms River alternate route

U.S. Route 9 Alternate (US 9 Alt.) was a  alternate route of US 9 that ran through Toms River, New Jersey. It was created in 1954 after US 9 was rerouted to use the Garden State Parkway through the Toms River area but was later renumbered to Route 166.

Newark–Jersey City temporary route

Jersey City truck route

U.S. Route 1/9 Truck (US 1/9 Truck) is a  truck route of US 1/9 in northern New Jersey between Newark and Jersey City that bypasses the Pulaski Skyway, which trucks are banned from. The route heads east across the Passaic River into Kearny before crossing the Hackensack River into Jersey City, where the truck route turns north at the Route 440 intersection. It intersects Route 7 before turning east and ending at the Tonnele Circle with US 1/9 and Route 139. Prior to 1953, US 1/9 Truck was designated as Route 25T, designating a truck bypass of Route 25, which formerly followed US 1/9 on the Pulaski Skyway.

Jersey City business route

U.S. Route 1/9 Business (US 1/9 Bus.) was a  former business route of US 1/9 in Jersey City that ran between US 1/9 at the Tonnele Circle and the Holland Tunnel across the Hudson River to New York City. The route was created in 1953, replacing what had been a part of Route 25. The business route was renumbered to Route 139 by the 1990s.

Jersey City–Inwood Hill Park alternate route

Newburgh alternate route

Rouses Point alternate route

References

External links

09
U.S. Route 9
U.S. Highways in Delaware
U.S. Highways in New Jersey